The governor of Donetsk Oblast is the head of executive branch for the Donetsk Oblast. Due to the current Russo-Ukrainian War Donetsk Oblast is, since 5 March 2015, assigned as a civil–military administration. Hence the governor of Donetsk Oblast is officially called Head of the Donetsk Regional Military Civil Administration.

The office of governor is an appointed position, with officeholders being appointed by the President of Ukraine, on recommendation from the Prime Minister of Ukraine, to serve a four-year term.

The official residence for the governor is located in Donetsk (currently relocated to Kramatorsk due to the war in Donbas). The governor is Pavlo Kyrylenko since 5 July 2019.

Governors

Chairman of Executive Committee of Donetsk Oblast
Governors of united region before its split into Stalino and Voroshylovhrad oblasts
 Mykhailo Nalimov (1932)
 Mykhailo Chuvyrin (1932–1933)
 Mykola Ivanov (1933–1937)
 Volodymyr Vsevolozhsky (1937)
 Petro Schpilyovy (1937–1939)

Chairman of Executive Committee of Donetsk (Stalino) Oblast
 Anton Gayovy (1939–1940)
 Pylyp Reshetnyak (1940–1941)
 Nazi German occupation (1941–1943)'' 
 Pylyp Reshetnyak (1943–1944)
 Oleksandr Struyev (1944–1947)
 M. Malyshev (1947) (acting)
 Mykola Alyshev (1957–1949)
 Mark Spivak (1949–1950)
 Viktor Kremenytsky (1950–1954)
 Danylo Adamets (1954–1956)
 Mykola Blyaton (Blagun) (1956–1959)
 Dmytro Grydasov (1959–1982)
 Viktor Pokhodin (1963–1964)
 Vasyl Myronov (1982)
 Anatoliy Statinov (1982–1987)
 Viktor Kucherenko (1987–1989)
 Yuriy Smirnov (1989–1990)
 Volodymyr Sheludchenko (1990)
 Yuriy Smirnov (1990–1992)

Representative of the President
 Yuriy Smirnov (1992–1994)

Chairman of the Executive Committee
 Volodymyr Shcherban (1994–1995)

Heads of the Administration
 Volodymyr Shcherban (1995–1996)
 Serhii Polyakov (1996–1997)
 Viktor Yanukovych (1997–2002)
 Anatoliy Blyznyuk (2002–2005)
 Volodymyr Logvynenko (2005) (acting)
 Vadym Chuprun (2005–2006)
 Serhiy Dergunov (2006) (acting)
 Volodymyr Logvynenko (2006–2010)
 Anatoliy Blyznyuk (2010–2011)
 Andriy Shyshatskiy (2011–2014) 
 Serhiy Taruta (2014)
 Oleksandr Kikhtenko (2014–2015)

Head of the Donetsk Regional Military Civil Administration
 Pavlo Zhebrivskyi (2015–2018)
 Oleksandr Kuts (2018–2019)
 Pavlo Kyrylenko (since 5 July 2019)

See also
 Donetsk Regional Committee of the Communist Party of Ukraine

Notes

References

External links
 World Statesmen.org
Government of Donetsk Oblast in Ukrainian

 
Donetsk Oblast